Byzacena (or Byzacium) (Byzakion) was a Late Roman province in the central part of Roman North Africa, which is now roughly Tunisia, split off from Africa Proconsularis.

History 

At the end of the 3rd century AD, the Roman emperor Diocletian divided the great Roman province of Africa Proconsularis into three smaller provinces: Zeugitana in the north, still governed by a proconsul and referred to as Proconsularis; Byzacena to its adjacent south, and Tripolitania to its adjacent south, roughly corresponding to southeast Tunisia and northwest Libya. Byzacena corresponded roughly to eastern Tunisia or the modern Tunisian region of Sahel.

Hadrumetum (modern Sousse) became the capital of the newly made province, whose governor had the rank of consularis. At this period the Metropolitan Archbishopric of Byzacena was, after the great metropolis Carthage, the most important city in Roman (North) Africa west of Egypt and its Patriarch of Alexandria.

Episcopal sees 
Ancient episcopal sees of Byzacena listed in the Annuario Pontificio as titular sees:

 Abaradira
 Abari
 Abidda (ruins of Ksour-Abbeda)
 Acholla (Henchir-El-Alia)
 Aeliae (Henchir-Mraba? Henchir-Merelma)
 Africa (Mahdia)
 Afufenia
 Aggar
 Aggersel (Abd-Er-Rahman-El-Garis? Tacrouna?)
 Ammaedara (Haïdra)
 Amudarsa (in the plain of Saïda)
 Ancusa
 Aquae Albae in Byzacena (in Gabès Governorate)
 Aquae in Byzacena (in Gabès Governorate)
 Aquae Regiae (Henchir-Baboucha?)
 Aurusuliana (in the territory of Henchir-Guennara)
 Ausafa
 Autenti
 Auzegera
 Bahanna (Henchir-Nebahna, ruins at Dhorbania?)
 Bararus (Henchir-Ronga, Rougga)
 Bassiana
 Bavagaliana
 Bennefa (Oglet-Khefifa)
 Bladia (Henchir-Baldia?)
 Buleliana
 Cabarasussi (Drâa-Bellouan)
 Carcabia
 Cariana
 Cebarades
 Cenculiana
 Cercina (Kerkennah Islands)
 Cibaliana
 Cillium alias Colonia Cillilana (Kasserine)
 Crepedula
 Cufruta
 Chusira (Kessera)
 Decoriana
 Dices (Henchir-Sidi-Salah, Sadic?)
 Dionysiana
 Drua (Henchir-Bou-Driès)
 Dura (Titular See)
 Edistiana
 Egnatia
 Febiana
 Feradi Maius (Henchir-El-Ferada?)
 Feradi Minus
 Filaca
 Fissiana (in the plain of Foussana?)
 Foratiana
 Forontoniana (Henchir-Bir-El-Menadka?)
 Gaguari
 Garriana (Henchir-El-Garra)
 Gemellae in Byzacena (Sidi-Aïch)
 Germaniciana (ruins of Ksour-El-Maïeta? Melloul? ruins of Hadjeh-El-Aïoun?)
 Gratiana
 Gubaliana (ruins of Djebeliana? ruins of Henchir-Goubel?)
 Gummi in Byzacena (Henchir-Gelama?, Henchir-El-Senem)
 Gurza (Kalâa Kebira)
 Hadrumetum (Sousse), the Metropolitan Archbishopric
 Hermiana
 Hierpiniana
 Hirina
 Horrea Coelia (Hergla)
 Iubaltiana (at Kairouan)
 Iunca in Byzacena (Ounga)
 Leptiminus
 Limisa (Henchir-Boudja)
 Macon
 Macriana Maior
 Macriana Minor
 Mactaris
 Madarsuma (Henchir-Bou-Doukhane?)
 Maraguia (ruins of Ksar-Margui?)
 Marazanae (Henchir-Guennara)
 Marazanae Regiae
 Masclianae (ruins of Hadjeb-El-Aioun?)
 Materiana
 Maximiana in Byzacena (near Sousse)
 Mediana (Bishopric)
 Menefessi (Henchir-Djemmiah)
 Mibiarca
 Midica (near Sfax)
 Mididi (Henchir-Medded, Midid)
 Mimiana
 Mozotcori
 Munatiana
 Mutia (Henchir-El-Gheria, Henchir-Furna)
 Muzuca in Byzacena (Henchir-Besra)
 Nara (Bir El Hafey)
 Nationa
 Nepte (Nafta)
 Octaba
 Octabia
 Pederodiana (Oum-Federa, Fodra?)
 Precausa
 Praesidium (Somâa)
 Putia in Byzacena (Bir-Abdallah?)
 Quaestoriana
 Rufiniana
 Ruspae
 Rusticiana
 Sassura (Henchir Es-Zaouadi)
 Scebatiana
 Segermes
 Selendeta
 Septimunicia (ruins of Oglet-El-Metnem? Henchir-El-Bliaa?)
 Severiana
 Sufes
 Sufetula
 Suliana
 Sullectum (Salacia)
 Tabalta (Henchir-Gourghebi?)
 Tagarbala (Bordj-Tamra, Tamera)
 Tagaria
 Tagase
 Talaptula
 Tamalluma (Oasis of Telmin)
 Tamata
 Tamazeni
 Tambeae (in the region of Aïn-Beida and Henchir-Baboucha)
 Tanudaia
 Taparura
 Taraqua (Ksour-El-Khaoua?)
 Tarasa in Byzacena (near Djebel-Trozza?)
 Temuniana (Henchir-Temounia?)
 Tetci
 Thagamuta (in the plain of Guemouda?)
 Thala
 Thapsus
 Thasbalta (in the valley of Segui?)
 Thelepte
 Thenae (Thyna)
 Theuzi
 Thiges (Bordj-Gourbata)
 Thucca Terenbenthina (Henchir Dougga)
 Thysdrus
 Tigias (Henchir-Taus, in the oasis of Kriz)
 Tiguala
 Trofimiana
 Tubulbaca (Teboulba?)
 Turrisblanda
 Turres in Byzacena (ruins of Tamarza? ruins of Msilica?)
 Turris Tamalleni (ruins of Oum-Es-Samâa)
 Tusuros
 Unizibira (Henchir-Zembra?)
 Usula
 Uzita
 Valentiniana
 Vartana (Srâa-Ouartane)
 Vassinassa
 Vegesela in Byzacena (Henchir-Recba)
 Vibiana
 Vicus Aterii (Bir el Ater)
 Victoriana
 Vicus Augusti (ruins of Sidi El Hani, Henchir-Sabra?)
 Vita (ruins of Beni-Derraj?)
 Zella (see) (Zaouila, suburb of Mahdia? ruins of Zellez?)

See also 
 List of Catholic dioceses in Tunisia
 List of Catholic dioceses (structured view)
 List of Catholic titular sees

References

Sources and external links 
 GCatholic - Tunisia
 Map of the Roman state according to the Compilation notitia dignitatum
 Place-names in the Compilation notitia dignitatum

 
Late Roman provinces
Provinces of the Byzantine Empire
Roman provinces in Africa
Africa (Roman province)
States and territories established in the 3rd century
States and territories disestablished in the 7th century
290s establishments
690s disestablishments
290s establishments in the Roman Empire
7th-century disestablishments in the Exarchate of Africa
Byzantine North Africa